Girardia can refer to two different genera of living organisms:

 Girardia (alga), a genus of red algae in the family Bangiaceae
 Girardia, a genus of freshwater triclad worm in the family Dugesiidae